Kevin Martin McBride (born 10 May 1973) is an Irish former professional boxer who is best known for defeating  Mike Tyson in 2005, in what would be the latter's final professional fight. As an amateur, McBride competed for Ireland at the 1992 Summer Olympics. He is married to Danielle Curran. The couple share two children, a daughter and son.

Professional career
McBride debuted in December 1992, with a draw against Gary Charlton. In 1997, he defeated Paul Douglas to win the All-Ireland Heavyweight Title, and in 2002 he defeated Craig Tomlinson to add the IBC Americas Heavyweight Title. McBride currently resides in the heavily Irish neighbourhood of Dorchester in Boston and trains in nearby Brockton, Massachusetts.

McBride's career-defining performance was a victory over Mike Tyson, former undisputed world heavyweight champion, Tyson quit the fight at the end of Round 6 by informing the referee that he would not be able to continue to round seven in the MCI Center in Washington, D.C. The aged Tyson explained in a post fight interview that his heart wasn't into the sport any more. Tyson announced his retirement after the bout, saying "I'm not going to disrespect the sport anymore by losing to this caliber of fighter".

McBride has suffered six losses by knockout—including twice against fighters with losing records. Since his fight with Mike Tyson, McBride beat Byron Polley, then suffered three upset losses. The first loss was against Mike Mollo, a second-round knockout loss. The second loss was against Andrew Golota, a sixth-round technical knockout loss after Golota skilfully worked a cut he had opened up over McBride's eye. After three years inactivity, McBride, the 'Clones Colossus', attempted a comeback in an eight rounder on 10 July 2010 at the Mid-Hudson Civic Center in Poughkeepsie, New York, but lost every round—and the bout—in an upset to cruiserweight veteran Zack Page, a journeyman with a losing record as a professional. Despite standing  and weighing 282 pounds to Page's  and 205 pounds, McBride was outworked and out punched by his smaller, faster, more aggressive opponent.

On 9 April 2011 McBride fought former cruiserweight and light heavyweight world champion Tomasz Adamek for the IBF International Heavyweight and NABO Heavyweight Championship belts at the Prudential Center in Newark, New Jersey. Adamek won a 12-round unanimous decision.

McBride ended his career after losing to Mariusz Wach on 29 July 2011 during a boxing gala held at Mohegan Sun Casino, Uncasville, Connecticut.

McBride's nickname, "The Clones Colossus", recalls Barry McGuigan's sobriquet "The Clones Cyclone".

Professional boxing record

|-
|align="center" colspan=8|35 wins (29 knockouts, 6 decisions), 10 losses (7 knockouts, 3 decisions), 1 draw
|-
| align="center" style="border-style: none none solid solid; background: #e3e3e3"|Result
| align="center" style="border-style: none none solid solid; background: #e3e3e3"|Record
| align="center" style="border-style: none none solid solid; background: #e3e3e3"|Opponent
| align="center" style="border-style: none none solid solid; background: #e3e3e3"|Type
| align="center" style="border-style: none none solid solid; background: #e3e3e3"|Round
| align="center" style="border-style: none none solid solid; background: #e3e3e3"|Date
| align="center" style="border-style: none none solid solid; background: #e3e3e3"|Location
| align="center" style="border-style: none none solid solid; background: #e3e3e3"|Notes
|-align=center
|Loss
|
|align=left| Mariusz Wach
|KO
|4
|29 July 2011    
|align=left| Uncasville, Connecticut, United States
|align=left|
|-align=center
|Loss
|
|align=left| Tomasz Adamek
|UD
|12
|9 April 2011    
|align=left| Newark, New Jersey, United States
|align=left|
|-align=center
|Loss
|
|align=left| Matt Skelton
|UD
|3
|9 October 2010    
|align=left| Bethnal Green, London, United Kingdom
|align=left|
|-align=center
|Win
|
|align=left| Franklin Egobi
|SD
|3
|9 October 2010    
|align=left| Bethnal Green, London, United Kingdom
|align=left|
|-align=center
|Loss
|
|align=left| Zack Page
|UD
|8
|10 July 2010    
|align=left| Poughkeepsie, New York, United States 
|align=left|
|-align=center
|Loss
|
|align=left| Andrew Golota
|TKO
|6
|6 October 2007    
|align=left| New York City, United States
|align=left|
|-align=center
|Loss
|
|align=left| Mike Mollo
|TKO
|2
|7 October 2006    
|align=left| Rosemont, Illinois, United States
|align=left|
|-align=center
|Win
|
|align=left| Byron Polley
|TKO
|4
|1 April 2006    
|align=left| Cleveland, Ohio, United States
|align=left|
|-align=center
|Win
|
|align=left| Mike Tyson
|RTD
|6
|11 June 2005
|align=left| Washington, District of Columbia, United States
|align=left|
|-align=center
|Win
|
|align=left| Kevin Montiy
|RTD
|5
|18 March 2005    
|align=left| Mashantucket, Connecticut, United States
|align=left|
|-align=center
|Win
|
|align=left| Marcus Rhode
|KO
|3
|4 December 2003    
|align=left| Boston, Massachusetts, United States
|align=left|
|-align=center
|Win
|
|align=left| Lenzie Morgan
|KO
|1
|9 August 2003    
|align=left| Brockton, Massachusetts, United States
|align=left|
|-align=center
|Win
|
|align=left| Najee Shaheed
|TKO
|9
|17 March 2003    
|align=left| Boston, Massachusetts, United States
|align=left|
|-align=center
|Win
|
|align=left| Craig Tomlinson
|KO
|3
|25 October 2002    
|align=left| Revere, Massachusetts, United States
|align=left|
|-align=center
|Win
|
|align=left| Reynaldo Minus
|KO
|3
|26 July 2002    
|align=left| Boston, Massachusetts, United States
|align=left|
|-align=center
|Win
|
|align=left| Gary Winmon
|TKO
|2
|24 May 2002    
|align=left| Revere, Massachusetts, United States
|align=left|
|-align=center
|Loss
|
|align=left| DaVarryl Williamson
|TKO
|5
|18 January 2002    
|align=left| Las Vegas, Nevada, United States
|align=left|
|-align=center
|Win
|
|align=left| Rodney McSwain
|PTS
|10
|3 November 2001    
|align=left| Little Rock, Arkansas, United States
|align=left|
|-align=center
|Win
|
|align=left| Willie Phillips
|PTS
|10
|11 August 2001    
|align=left| Little Rock, Arkansas, United States
|align=left|
|-align=center
|Win
|
|align=left| Domingo Monroe
|KO
|1
|26 June 1999
|align=left| Quincy, Massachusetts, United States
|align=left|
|-align=center
|Loss
|
|align=left| Michael Murray
|TKO
|3
|11 April 1998
|align=left| Southwark, London, United Kingdom
|align=left|
|-align=center
|Win
|
|align=left| Yuriy Yelistratov
|TKO
|1
|22 November 1997
|align=left| Manchester, United Kingdom
|align=left|
|-align=center
|Loss
|
|align=left| Axel Schulz
|TKO
|9
|30 August 1997
|align=left| Prenzlauer Berg, Berlin, Germany
|align=left|
|-align=center
|Win
|
|align=left| Paul Douglas
|TKO
|5
|2 June 1997
|align=left| Belfast, Northern Ireland, United Kingdom
|align=left|
|-align=center
|Win
|
|align=left| Stoyan Stoyanov
|TKO
|1
|28 April 1997
|align=left| Hull, Yorkshire, United Kingdom
|align=left|
|-align=center
|Loss
|
|align=left| Louis Monaco
|TKO
|5
|7 February 1997
|align=left| Las Vegas, Nevada, United States
|align=left|
|-align=center
|Win
|
|align=left| Tui Toia
|TKO
|2
|14 January 1997
|align=left| Kansas City, Missouri, United States
|align=left|
|-align=center
|Win
|
|align=left| Roger McKenzie
|TKO
|6
|3 December 1996
|align=left| Liverpool, Merseyside, United Kingdom
|align=left|
|-align=center
|Win
|
|align=left| Shane Woollas
|TKO
|2
|6 November 1996
|align=left| redirect page, United Kingdom
|align=left|
|-align=center
|Win
|
|align=left| Steve Garber
|TKO
|7
|2 July 1995
|align=left| Dublin, Ireland
|align=left|
|-align=center
|Win
|
|align=left| Atelea Kalhea
|KO
|1
|13 May 1995
|align=left| Sacramento, California, United States
|align=left|
|-align=center
|Win
|
|align=left| Jimmy Harrison
|TKO
|1
|22 April 1995
|align=left| Boston, Massachusetts, United States
|align=left|
|-align=center
|Win
|
|align=left| Carl McGrew
|TKO
|5
|4 March 1995
|align=left| Boston, Massachusetts, United States
|align=left|
|-align=center
|Win
|
|align=left| Carl Gaffney
|TKO
|1
|7 February 1995
|align=left| Ipswich, Suffolk, United Kingdom
|align=left|
|-align=center
|Win
|
|align=left| John Lampre
|TKO
|1
|10 December 1994
|align=left| Portland, Maine, United States
|align=left|
|-align=center
|Win
|
|align=left| Dean Storey
|TKO
|3
|12 November 1994
|align=left| Dublin, Ireland
|align=left|
|-align=center
|Win
|
|align=left| Graham Arnold
|TKO
|2
|24 September 1994
|align=left| Wembley, London, United Kingdom
|align=left|
|-align=center
|Win
|
|align=left| James Truesdale
|TKO
|3
|26 August 1994
|align=left| Upper Marlboro, Maryland, United States
|align=left|
|-align=center
|Win
|
|align=left| Stanley Wright
|PTS
|6
|17 June 1994
|align=left| Atlantic City, New Jersey, United States
|align=left|
|-align=center
|Win
|
|align=left| Roger Bryant
|TKO
|1
|4 June 1994
|align=left| Reno, Nevada, United States
|align=left|
|-align=center
|Win
|
|align=left| Edgar Turpin
|TKO
|1
|6 May 1994
|align=left| Atlantic City, New Jersey, United States
|align=left|
|-align=center
|Win
|
|align=left| John Harewood
|TKO
|3
|1 December 1993
|align=left| Bethnal Green, London, United Kingdom
|align=left|
|-align=center
|Win
|
|align=left| Chris Coughlan
|PTS
|4
|13 October 1993
|align=left| Bethnal Green, London, United Kingdom
|align=left|
|-align=center
|Win
|
|align=left| Joey Paladino
|KO
|2
|15 September 1993
|align=left| Bethnal Green, London, United Kingdom
|align=left|
|-align=center
|Win
|
|align=left| Gary Williams
|PTS
|4
|13 February 1993
|align=left| Manchester, United Kingdom
|align=left|
|-align=center
|style="background: #c5d2ea"|Draw
|
|align=left| Gary Charlton
|PTS
|6
|17 December 1992
|align=left| Barking, London, United Kingdom
|align=left|
|}

References

External links
 
 

Heavyweight boxers
1973 births
Living people
People from Clones, County Monaghan
Olympic boxers of Ireland
Boxers at the 1992 Summer Olympics
Prizefighter contestants
Sportspeople from County Monaghan
Irish male boxers